Narvekar is a surname. Notable people with the surname include:

Dayanand Narvekar (born 1950), Indian politician
Ganeshraj Narvekar (born 1993), Indian cricketer
Lata Narvekar, Marathi drama producer
Sanjay Narvekar (born 1962), Indian actor
Yash Narvekar, Indian playback singer, composer, and lyricist